Denise Sundberg (born 16 November 1990) is a Swedish footballer defender who plays for Kvarnsvedens IK.

External links 
 

1990 births
Living people
Swedish women's footballers
Damallsvenskan players
Women's association football defenders
Kvarnsvedens IK players